Paolo Mietto (26 May 1934 – 25 May 2020) was an Italian-born Ecuadorian Roman Catholic bishop.

Mietto was born in Italy and was ordained to the priesthood in 1963. He served as titular bishop of Muzuca in Byzacena and as coadjutor vicar apostolic of the Apostolic Vicariate of Napo, Ecuador from 1994 to 1996. He then served as bishop of the Apostolic Vicariate of Napo from 1996 to 2010.

Notes

1934 births
2020 deaths
20th-century Roman Catholic bishops in Ecuador
Italian Roman Catholic bishops in South America
21st-century Roman Catholic bishops in Ecuador
Roman Catholic bishops of Napo